John Howard Vaughan CBE (14 November 1879 – 21 August 1955), known as Howard, was an Australian politician. He was a member of the South Australian Legislative Council from 1912 to 1918, representing the United Labor Party (1912-1917) and the National Party (1917-1918). He served as the Attorney-General of South Australia from 1915 to 1917.

In the 1917 Labor split, Vaughan was expelled along with his brother, Premier Crawford Vaughan, and joined the new National Party. Upon the defeat of the Vaughan ministry in July 1917, Vaughan did not nominate for a position in the new coalition ministry of Archibald Peake, and enlisted to serve in World War I. He was controversially opposed at the 1918 election while away on active service, and being unable to campaign was defeated by Labor candidate Tom Gluyas.

Vaughan was appointed a Commander of the Order of the British Empire in 1932.

References

 

1879 births
1955 deaths
Australian Labor Party members of the Parliament of South Australia
Australian Commanders of the Order of the British Empire
Attorneys-General of South Australia
Place of birth missing
Members of the South Australian Legislative Council